Audacieux was a  74-gun ship of the line of the French Navy.

Career 
Audacieux was one of the ships built in the various shipyards captured by the First French Empire in Holland and Italy in a crash programme to replenish the ranks of the French Navy.

The Dutch seized Audacieux when the French evacuated Amsterdam on 14 November 1813 and commissioned her as Colite, later renamed to Wassenaar. She was decommissioned in 1827.

Notes, citations, and references

Notes

Citations

References
 

Ships of the line of the French Navy
Téméraire-class ships of the line
1816 ships